Events from the year 1758 in Wales.

Incumbents
Lord Lieutenant of North Wales (Lord Lieutenant of Anglesey, Caernarvonshire, Flintshire, Merionethshire, Montgomeryshire) – George Cholmondeley, 3rd Earl of Cholmondeley 
Lord Lieutenant of Glamorgan – Other Windsor, 4th Earl of Plymouth
Lord Lieutenant of Brecknockshire and Lord Lieutenant of Monmouthshire – Thomas Morgan
Lord Lieutenant of Cardiganshire – Wilmot Vaughan, 3rd Viscount Lisburne
Lord Lieutenant of Carmarthenshire – George Rice
Lord Lieutenant of Denbighshire – Richard Myddelton
Lord Lieutenant of Pembrokeshire – Sir William Owen, 4th Baronet
Lord Lieutenant of Radnorshire – Howell Gwynne

Bishop of Bangor – John Egerton
Bishop of Llandaff – Richard Newcome
Bishop of St Asaph – Robert Hay Drummond
Bishop of St Davids – Anthony Ellys

Events
April - Goronwy Owen becomes headmaster of the grammar school attached to the College of William & Mary, Williamsburg, Virginia.
13 July - Josiah Tucker becomes Dean of Gloucester.
October - Evan Evans (Ieuan Fardd) becomes curate of Llanllechid.
December - The Llangibby estate passes into the hands of the Addams-Williams family when the original Williams line dies out.
date unknown - The Welsh Charity School becomes co-educational.

Arts and literature

New books
Peter Williams - Blodau i Blant

Music
John Thomas - Caniadau Siôn, vol. 1

Births
3 May - Stephen Kemble, Herefordshire-born actor, brother of Sarah Siddons (died 1822)
24 (or 20) August - Sir Thomas Picton, soldier (died 1815)
3 September - Henrietta Clive, Countess of Powis (died 1822)
18 October - Theophilus Jones, lawyer and historian (died 1830)
date unknown - Richard Fothergill, ironmaster (died 1821)
probable - Isaac Davis, advisor to Kamehameha I of Hawaii (died 1810)

Deaths
24 January - William Wogan, religious writer, 79
25 January - Herbert Windsor, 2nd Viscount Windsor, 50
18 March - Matthew Hutton, Archbishop of Canterbury and former Bishop of Bangor, 65
24 March - Sir Thomas Mostyn, 4th Baronet, 53
December - Sir Leonard Williams, 5th Baronet

References

Wales
Wales